Hans Mets (30 August 1882 Kõo Parish, Viljandi County – ?) was an Estonian politician. He was a member of Estonian Constituent Assembly.

References

1882 births
Members of the Estonian Constituent Assembly
Year of death missing